The West Darien Historic District is a historic district in Darien, Georgia. It was added to the National Register of Historic Places (NRHP) on September 17, 2001.

History
Darien was founded in 1736 about 1 mile from Fort King George, which was built in 1721. Darien was directly protected by Fort Darien, built in 1736. The current streets were laid out in an 1806 plan. The town was mostly destroyed in 1863 when it was burned by Union troops. Rebuilding the town started on the east side, followed by the west side. The east side of historic Darien is in the NRHP Vernon Square-Columbus Square Historic District. As of 2001, only one antebellum structure remained; otherwise the oldest buildings are from 1870 to 1910. The district includes 143 contributing buildings and eight contributing sites.

Archaeology
The district contains a number of archaeological sites that were the subject of two studies in 1978 and 1983 as part of construction projects. These studies yielded both prehistoric and antebellum artifacts.

Photos

See also
 Vernon Square-Columbus Square Historic District

References

External links
 

Buildings and structures in McIntosh County, Georgia
Colonial Revival architecture in Georgia (U.S. state)
Geography of McIntosh County, Georgia
Historic districts on the National Register of Historic Places in Georgia (U.S. state)
National Register of Historic Places in McIntosh County, Georgia